Christopher Anthony McGeorge (born 13 January 1962) is a British track and field athlete who was the 1985 Summer Universiade champion in the 1500 metres.

Athletics career
McGeorge was born in Carlisle, Cumberland. Representing England, he won a bronze medal in the 800 metres at the 1982 Commonwealth Games in Brisbane, Queensland, Australia. This was Britain's first medal in this event for 28 years.

He was the 1988 winner of the Emsley Carr Mile. Nationally, he was the AAA Indoor Championships 800 m winner in 1982, and  third in the 1500 m at the AAA Championships in 1981, 1982 and 1983. He was also third in the 1500 m at the 1989 UK Athletics Championships.

International competitions

National titles
AAA Indoor Championships
800 m: 1982

See also
List of Commonwealth Games medallists in athletics (men)
List of middle-distance runners

References

1962 births
Living people
English male middle-distance runners
Commonwealth Games bronze medallists for England
Commonwealth Games medallists in athletics
Athletes (track and field) at the 1982 Commonwealth Games
Universiade medalists in athletics (track and field)
Universiade gold medalists for Great Britain
Medallists at the 1982 Commonwealth Games